The Hamburg Armory is an historic National Guard armory which is located in Hamburg, Berks County, Pennsylvania.

It was added to the National Register of Historic Places in 1991.

History and architectural features
Built between 1938 and 1939, the Hamburg Armory is a "T"-shaped building consisting of a three-and-one-half-story, front administration section and two-and-one-half-story, rear drill hall.

A one-story addition was erected in 1972.

The building was designed in the Art Deco style, and was constructed of brick. It sits on a concrete foundation.

It was added to the National Register of Historic Places in 1991.

Gallery

References

Armories on the National Register of Historic Places in Pennsylvania
Art Deco architecture in Pennsylvania
Government buildings completed in 1939
Buildings and structures in Berks County, Pennsylvania
National Register of Historic Places in Berks County, Pennsylvania